Adobe Dreamweaver is a web development tool developed by Adobe Systems.

Dreamweaver or Dream Weaver(s) may also refer to:

Music 
 The Dream Weavers, a 1950s pop music singing group
 Dream Weaver (album), a 1966 album by Charles Lloyd
 Dreamweaver (Sabbat album), 1989
 Dreamweaver (George Duke album), 2013
 Dreamweaver, an album by Golem
 The Dream Weaver, a 1975 album by Gary Wright
 "Dream Weaver", a song by Gary Wright from The Dream Weaver (1975)
 "Dream Weaver", a song by REO Speedwagon from This Time We Mean It
 "Dreamweaver", a song by Stratovarius from Elements Pt. 2

Other uses 
 T'nalak dreamweavers, traditional weavers of t'nalak cloth of the T'boli people, the designs of which are inspired by dreams
 Dreamweaver, a type of fictional character in the fantasy novel trilogy Age of the Five
 Dream Weavers (anthology), a 1996 fantasy anthology
 "Dream Weaver" (King of the Hill), an episode of King of the Hill
 "Dream Weaver" (seaQuest DSV), an episode of seaQuest DSV
 "Dream Weaver" (Supergirl), an episode of Supergirl
 Dream Weavers, a home world in the video game Spyro the Dragon
 Dreamweaver, a wheat beer brewed by Tröegs Brewing Company